Şenyurt is a village in the Ardeşen District, Rize Province, in Black Sea Region of Turkey. Its population is 272 (2022).

History 
According to list of villages in Laz language book (2009), name of the village is Mexeniti. Most villagers are ethnically Laz.

Population

References

Villages in Ardeşen District